Thomas Sean McBreen (born August 31, 1952) is an American former swimmer and Olympic gold medalist.  At the 1972 Summer Olympics in Munich, Germany, McBreen earned a gold medal as a member of the winning U.S. team in the 4×100-meter freestyle relay, and also won the bronze medal in the men's 400-meter freestyle.

See also
 List of Olympic medalists in swimming (men)
 List of University of Southern California people
 World record progression 400 metres freestyle
 World record progression 4 × 200 metres freestyle relay

References
  Tom McBreen – Olympic Games results at databaseOlympics.com

1952 births
Living people
American male freestyle swimmers
World record setters in swimming
Olympic bronze medalists for the United States in swimming
Sportspeople from Spokane, Washington
Place of birth missing (living people)
Swimmers at the 1971 Pan American Games
Swimmers at the 1972 Summer Olympics
USC Trojans men's swimmers
Medalists at the 1972 Summer Olympics
Pan American Games silver medalists for the United States
Olympic gold medalists for the United States in swimming
Pan American Games medalists in swimming
Junípero Serra High School (San Mateo, California) alumni
Medalists at the 1971 Pan American Games